American actor, writer, and director Jordan Peele has received a variety of awards and nominations for his work.

Jordan Peele has been nominated for eight Primetime Emmy Award nominations, including seven for the Comedy Central sketch series Key and Peele which ran from 2012 to 2015. He and Keegan-Michael Key won the Primetime Emmy Award for Outstanding Variety Sketch Series in 2016. Peele also received critical acclaim for his directorial film debut, a satirical horror film, Get Out (2017) for which he received three Academy Award nominations for Best Picture, Best Director, and Best Original Screenplay, the latter of which he won. He also received British Academy Film Award, Golden Globe Award, and Screen Actors Guild Award nominations.

Major associations

Academy Awards

British Academy Film Awards

Britannia Awards

Primetime Emmy Awards

Golden Globe Awards

Guild Awards

Writers Guild Award

Directors Guild Award

Producers Guild Award

Screen Actors Guild Awards

Other awards

In 2020, he was name the Rondo Hatton Classic Horror Awards' Monster Kid of the Year.
Notes

References

Peele, Jordan, list of awards and nominations received by
Peele, Jordan, list of awards and nominations received by
Peele, Jordan, list of awards and nominations received by
African American-related lists